Mohd Yusof bin Apdal is a Malaysian politician who has served as the Deputy Minister of Higher Education in the Pakatan Harapan (PH) administration under Prime Minister Anwar Ibrahim and Minister Mohamed Khaled Nordin since December 2022 and the Member of Parliament (MP) for Lahad Datu since November 2022. He is a member of the Heritage Party (WARISAN) and also younger brother of President of WARISAN and MP for Semporna Shafie Apdal.

Election results

Honours
  :
  Knight Companion of the Order of the Crown of Pahang (DIMP) – Dato' (2010)

References

Living people
People from Sabah
Bajau people
Suluk people
Malaysian Muslims
Malaysian political party founders
Former United Malays National Organisation politicians
Sabah Heritage Party politicians
Members of the Dewan Rakyat
Members of the Sabah State Legislative Assembly
Year of birth missing (living people)